Djamel Menad (born 22 July 1960) is an Algerian retired professional footballer, who played as a forward and who manages USM El Harrach.

Club career
Born in El Bayadh, Menad started his playing career with CR Belouizdad, before moving to JS Kabylie. In 1987, he signed with French side Nîmes Olympique, competing in three Ligue 2 seasons and appearing in nearly 100 official games. In 1989–90, he scored a career-best – in Europe – 12 goals in 27 games, but his team fell short of promotion after finishing in third position.

Menad spent the following three seasons in Portugal, appearing for F.C. Famalicão (two seasons) and C.F. Os Belenenses, always in the top division. Subsequently, aged 33, he returned to his country and retired four years later, after stints with former club Kabylie (where he won the African Cup Winners' Cup in 1995) and USM Alger.

In 2005, Menad started coaching, managing his last team as a player. On 14 May 2011, he was fired from his post at JSM Bejaia.

International career
Menad gained the first of his 81 caps for Algeria in 1982. Previously, in 1980, he played Olympic football in Moscow, helping the national team to the quarterfinals.

Menad was selected to the squad for the 1986 FIFA World Cup. There, he appeared in group stage losses against Brazil and Spain. In 1990, he helped the hosts win the Africa Cup of Nations, finishing as the competition's top scorer with four goals.

Menad finished third for the 1986 African Footballer of the Year award.

Doping mystery
In November 2011 Menad, who has a disabled daughter, and other of his World Cup Finals teammates called for an investigation into whether their children's disabilities had in any way to do with medication ordered to them by Algeria's Soviet coach Evgeni Rogov.

Managerial career
Menad was appointed manager of USM El Harrach in October 2020.

Honours
CR Belouizdad
 Algerian Cup: 1977–78

JS Kabylie
 African Cup Winners' Cup: 1994–95
 Algerian League: 1981–82, 1982–83, 1984–85, 1985–86, 1994–95
 Algerian Cup: 1985–86

Algeria
Africa Cup of Nations: 1990

Individual
Africa Cup of Nations top scorer: 1990
Africa Cup of Nations Team of the Tournament:1984, 1990

References

External links

1960 births
Living people
People from El Bayadh
Kabyle people
Algerian footballers
Association football forwards
JS El Biar players
CR Belouizdad players
JS Kabylie players
Ligue 2 players
Nîmes Olympique players
Primeira Liga players
F.C. Famalicão players
C.F. Os Belenenses players
Algeria international footballers
Algeria youth international footballers
1986 FIFA World Cup players
1984 African Cup of Nations players
1986 African Cup of Nations players
1988 African Cup of Nations players
1990 African Cup of Nations players
1992 African Cup of Nations players
Africa Cup of Nations-winning players
Olympic footballers of Algeria
Footballers at the 1980 Summer Olympics
Algerian expatriate footballers
Expatriate footballers in France
Expatriate footballers in Portugal
Algerian expatriate sportspeople in France
Algerian expatriate sportspeople in Portugal
Algerian football managers
USM Alger managers
USM Annaba managers
JSM Béjaïa managers
CR Belouizdad managers
MC Alger managers
Al-Wehda Club (Mecca) managers
USM El Harrach managers
Saudi First Division League managers
Algerian expatriate football managers
Expatriate football managers in Saudi Arabia
Algerian expatriate sportspeople in Saudi Arabia
21st-century Algerian people